Dope may refer to:

Chemistry

Biochemistry
 Dope, a slang word for a euphoria-producing drug, particularly:
 Cocaine
 Cannabis (drug)
 Heroin
 Opium 
 DOPE, or 1,2-Dioleoyl-sn-glycero-3-phosphoethanolamine, a phospholipid
 Discrete optimized protein energy, a method of assessing homology models in protein structure prediction
 Dopamine, also colloquially called "dope", a neurotransmitter in the human brain that causes pleasure
 Dopant, an impurity added to a substance to alter its properties

Industrial substances
 Aircraft dope, a substance painted onto fabric-covered aircraft to tauten the skin
 Dope, a technical expression for the solution of polymers from which fibers are spun; see Wet processing engineering 
 Peg dope, a substance used to coat the bearing surfaces of the tuning pegs of string instruments
 Pipe dope, a sealant applied to pipe threads to ensure a leakproof and pressure-tight seal

Arts, entertainment, and media

Films
 Dope (1924 film), a 1924 Australian silent film
 Dope (2015 film), a 2015 film starring Shameik Moore, Zoë Kravitz and A$AP Rocky

Literature
 Dope (novel), a 1919 novel by Sax Rohmer
 DOPE (an acronym for Data on Personal Equipment, or Data on Previous Engagement), a book used with sniper equipment

Music

Groups
 Dope (band), an industrial metal band from the U.S. city of Villa Park, Illinois
 Edsel Dope (born 1974), the lead singer and rhythm guitarist of the band Dope
 Dope D.O.D., a Dutch hip hop crew
 D.O.P.E., a Southern hip hop group; acronym for Destroying Other People's Egos

Songs
 "Dope" (Lady Gaga song), 2013
 "Dope" (Tyga song), 2013
 "Dope" (T.I. song), 2016
 "She's Dope!", a 1990 song by Bell Biv DeVoe, originally titled "Dope!"
 "Dope", a song by BTS from the 2015 album The Most Beautiful Moment in Life, Pt. 1
 "Dope", a song by D'espairsRay from the 2010 album Monsters
 "Dope", a song by Fifth Harmony from the 2016 album 7/27
 "Dope!", a song by Royce da 5'9", featuring Loren W. Oden, from the 2016 album Layers
 "Dope", a song by Swedish singer Ängie, from the 2018 EP Suicidal Since 1995

Television
 Dope (TV series), a 2017-2019 Netflix documentary series revolving around drugs

Other
 DOPE (Dartmouth Oversimplified Programming Experiment), a simple programming language that was a precursor to BASIC

See also
 Dopey (disambiguation)
 Doping (disambiguation)
 Rope-a-dope (disambiguation)
 Dodecahedral prism
 
 stupidity